William Gore (died 25 February 1784) was an 18th-century Anglican bishop in Ireland.

Life
He was born the son of the Right Reverend William Gore, Dean of Down and his wife Honora Prittie.

Previously the Dean of Cashel from 1736 to 1758, he was nominated Bishop of Clonfert and Kilmacduagh on 17 March 1758, consecrated on 16 April of that year; translated to Elphin on 3 March 1762;  and finally to Limerick, Ardfert and Aghadoe on 5 March 1772.

In 1783 he commissioned the building of a Manor House at Old Connaught, near Bray, but in County Dublin. Old Connaught House still exists today as a private and gated development of apartments in and around the Old House.

He died on 25 February 1784.

Family
Gore married twice: firstly, to Mary, daughter of Chidley Coote; and secondly, to Mary, daughter of William French, with whom he had a son, William, who became an MP for Carrick.

References

Bishops of Clonfert and Kilmacduagh
Anglican bishops of Elphin
Bishops of Limerick, Ardfert and Aghadoe
1784 deaths
Deans of Cashel
Year of birth unknown
Diocese of Limerick, Ardfert and Aghadoe
18th-century Anglican bishops in Ireland